Blantyre railway station serves the burgh of Blantyre, near Hamilton in South Lanarkshire, Scotland. It is located on the Argyle Line, 14 km (8¾ miles) south east of Glasgow Central railway station (Low Level). Passenger services are provided by ScotRail Trains on behalf of Strathclyde Partnership for Transport.

History 

The Clydesdale Junction Railway (CJR) was authorised in 1845, but before being opened, was absorbed by the Caledonian Railway (CR) in 1846. The section of the CJR between Newton and Hamilton was opened by the CR on 5 September 1849, with Blantyre station opening on 17 September 1849.

Originally a Victorian style station featuring two wooden station buildings, one on each of the two platforms, these were demolished in the late 1970s. It was replaced by a modern building on the western side of the line.

Originally served by steam trains and later diesel multiple units, the line originally connected Blantyre to Glasgow Central High Level. Following the West Coast Main Line electrification in 1974 by British Rail, the line was worked by electric multiple units with services via Cambuslang and occasional services via Kirkhill. Upon development of the Argyle Line it was connected through to the north western fringes of Glasgow.

There are two tracks; both are electrified on the 25 kV 50 Hz AC overhead system. Each track has a platform on the outside of the rail line, long enough for an eight-coach train.

Services

2006/07 
Monday to Saturdays, 4 trains per hour go to Glasgow Central Low Level, before continuing to (/) northbound. Southbound a half-hourly service operates to  via ; one of these per hour continues to  via . Additionally a half-hourly  express service calls at Blantyre before continuing up to  then onto the Larkhall line and terminating.

2014/15 

Mondays to Saturdays still sees four services per hour each way calling here, but following a recast of the Argyle Line timetable the destination pattern has changed significantly.  Northbound there are now four trains per hour to  - one each via Clydebank and via Singer every 30 minutes calling at all stations en route.  Southbound there are two trains per hour to Larkhall and two to Motherwell, with one of the latter each hour extended to Cumbernauld via Whifflet rather than Lanark via Holytown.  On Sundays there are two trains each hour between Motherwell and Milngavie calling in each direction along with an hourly service each way between Balloch and Larkhall.

2016 

The southbound pattern remains unchanged, as does the Sunday service.

References

Notes

Sources 

 
 
 
 

Railway stations in South Lanarkshire
Former Caledonian Railway stations
Railway stations in Great Britain opened in 1849
SPT railway stations
Railway stations served by ScotRail
1849 establishments in Scotland
Blantyre, South Lanarkshire